Gabashane Vincent Rakabaele (3 September 1948 – 2 November 2003) was a Lesotho long-distance runner. He competed in the marathon at the 1980 Summer Olympics and the 1984 Summer Olympics.

References

1948 births
2003 deaths
Athletes (track and field) at the 1978 Commonwealth Games
Athletes (track and field) at the 1980 Summer Olympics
Athletes (track and field) at the 1984 Summer Olympics
Lesotho male long-distance runners
Lesotho male marathon runners
Olympic athletes of Lesotho
Commonwealth Games competitors for Lesotho
Place of birth missing